Bolusanthus speciosus (tree wisteria) is a species of flowering plants in the family Fabaceae. It belongs to the subfamily Faboideae. It is the only member of the genus Bolusanthus .

Description
It has black, fissured rough bark and also drooping branches. Between September and October, when the tree has no leaves it begins to bloom, with lilac blue flowers. Later it produces a seed capsule, the grey pods contain 3-8 smooth, bright yellow or brown seeds.

The wood is very hard, heavy and yellow in colour. It can be used for axe-handles, wagon spokes and fencing  poles. The tree is also grown in gardens due to the attractive flowers.

Distribution
It is native to KwaZulu-Natal and Northern Provinces (of South Africa), Eswatini, Botswana, Malawi, Mozambique, Zambia and Zimbabwe. It is found in low - medium altitudes in woodland or wooded grasslands.

Taxonomy
The genus name of Bolusanthus is in honour of Harry Bolus, (1834 – 1911) who was a South African botanist, botanical artist, businessman and philanthropist, and 'anthus' the Greek word for flower.

It was first published and described by (Bolus) Hermann Harms (a German botanist) in Repert. Spec. Nov. Regni Veg. 2: 15 in 1906.

References

Flora of Southern Africa
Trees of Africa
Sophoreae
Plants described in 1906
Monotypic Fabaceae genera